The Narcotics Story is a 1958 American film directed by Robert W. Larsen.

The film is also known as Goofballs and Tea (American informal short title).

Plot summary 
This police training film uses dramatizations of real life events to demonstrate the battle law enforcement faces with narcotics, most specifically barbiturates - also known as "goof balls" - and marijuana - also known as "tea". It shows how to identify certain narcotics, identify the signs that someone is using, identify the signs of where drug deals take place, identify the signs of use in a secluded public place, and apprehend the users in these public settings. As it follows one young woman neglected by her parents, the film also shows the underlying causes of narcotics use, with these underlying causes often the forgotten issue as everyone tends to deal with the symptoms.

Cast 
Art Gilmore as Narrator (voice)

Herbert Crisp, Officer Joe Delro, Darlene Hendricks, Bob Hopkins, Douglas Kester, Patricia Lynn, Fred Marratto, John Murphy, Allen Pitt, Sharon Strand and Nan Terry also appear.

External links 

1958 films
1958 drama films
American drama films
1950s English-language films
1950s American films